NDI may refer to:

Organisations
 National Dance Institute, a not for profit organization
 National Democratic Institute for International Affairs
 National Datacast Incorporated, the PBS datacasting subsidiary

Science and technology
 Nephrogenic diabetes insipidus, a form of diabetes insipidus due primarily to pathology of the kidney
 Network Device Interface, an IP Video and Audio Protocol developed by NewTek
 Naphthalene diimides, dyes used in chemistry; See Naphthalene tetracarboxylic dianhydride
 New Dietary Ingredient, defined by the Dietary Supplement Health and Education Act of 1994 to be a dietary ingredient not marketed in the United States before October 15, 1994

Other uses
 Non-Destructive Inspection, in nondestructive testing
 Non-developmental item, in the Federal Acquisition Regulation
 Net disposable income